Police Women of Maricopa County is the second of TLC's Police Women reality documentary series, which follows four female members of the Maricopa County Sheriff's Office in Maricopa County, Arizona.

The series features four women: Detective Deborah Moyer, Detective Lindsey Smith, Deputy Kelly Bocardo and Deputy Amie Duong; and follows the women at their jobs as law enforcement officials and at home with their families.

Cast
 Deputy Amie Duong
 Deputy Kelly Bocardo
 Deputy Lindsey Smith
 Detective Deborah "Deb" Moyer

Episodes

References

2010s American reality television series
2010 American television series debuts
2010 American television series endings
English-language television shows
Television shows set in Maricopa County, Arizona
Police Women (TV series)
TLC (TV network) original programming
Women in Arizona